The 2020 CONCACAF Champions League (officially the 2020 Scotiabank CONCACAF Champions League for sponsorship reasons) was the 12th edition of the CONCACAF Champions League under its current name, and overall the 55th edition of the premier football club competition organized by CONCACAF, the regional governing body of North America, Central America, and the Caribbean.

Starting from this season, only 10 of the 16 teams directly qualified for the tournament, with the other six berths allocated through the CONCACAF League, where previously only the winners would have qualified.

UANL defeated Los Angeles FC in the final to win their first CONCACAF club title. As the winners of the 2020 CONCACAF Champions League, they qualified for the 2020 FIFA Club World Cup in Qatar. Monterrey were the title holders, but did not qualify for this tournament and were unable to defend their title.

On 12 March 2020, CONCACAF suspended the tournament with immediate effect due to the COVID-19 pandemic. On 13 March, CONCACAF suspended all competitions scheduled over the next 30 days.

On 2 November 2020, it was announced that the tournament would resume at a centralized location in the United States from 15 to 22 December 2020, with the sole quarter-final to have not completed a first leg, semi-finals, and final played as single-leg matches. On 10 November, Exploria Stadium in Orlando, Florida was designated as the host for the remainder of the tournament, which consisted of seven matches, including the quarter-finals, semi-finals, and final.

Qualification
A total of 16 teams participated in the CONCACAF Champions League:
Ten teams which directly qualified for the tournament:
North American Zone: 9 teams (from three associations)
Caribbean Zone: 1 team (from one association)
Six teams qualified through the CONCACAF League (from between two and six associations)

Therefore, teams from between 6 and 10 out of the 41 CONCACAF member associations could participate in the CONCACAF Champions League.

North America
The nine direct berths for the North American Football Union (NAFU), which consisted of three member associations, were allocated as follows: four berths each for Mexico and the United States, and one berth for Canada.

For Mexico, the champions and runners-up of the Liga MX Apertura and Clausura Liguilla (playoff) tournaments qualified for the CONCACAF Champions League. If there was any team which were finalists of both tournaments, the vacated berth was reallocated using a formula, based on regular season records, that ensured that two teams qualified via each tournament.

For the United States, four teams qualified for the CONCACAF Champions League, three through the Major League Soccer (MLS) season and one through its domestic cup competition:
The champions of the 2019 MLS Cup, the championship match of the MLS Cup Playoffs
The champions of the Supporters' Shield, awarded to the team with the best MLS regular season record
The MLS regular season champions of either the Eastern Conference or Western Conference which were not the Supporters' Shield champions
The champions of the 2019 U.S. Open Cup
If there was any team which qualified through multiple berths, or if there was any Canada-based MLS team which were champions of the MLS Cup, the Supporters' Shield, or conference regular season, the vacated berth was reallocated to the U.S.-based team with the best MLS regular season record not yet qualified.

For Canada, the champions of the 2019 Canadian Championship, its domestic cup competition which awards the Voyageurs Cup, qualified for the CONCACAF Champions League. While some Canada-based teams competed in MLS, they could not qualify through either the MLS regular season or playoffs. Moreover, a team from the Canadian Premier League qualified for the CONCACAF League, meaning a second team from Canada (and a tenth team from North America) could potentially qualify for the CONCACAF Champions League.

Central America
Teams from the Central American Football Union (UNCAF), which consisted of seven member associations, had to qualify for the CONCACAF Champions League through the CONCACAF League. A total of eighteen teams from Central America qualified for the CONCACAF League through their domestic leagues. As all but four teams in the CONCACAF League were from Central America, between two and six teams from Central America could qualify for the CONCACAF Champions League.

Caribbean
Teams from the Caribbean Football Union (CFU), which consisted of 31 member associations, qualified for the CONCACAF Champions League either as champions of the CONCACAF Caribbean Club Championship, the first-tier subcontinental Caribbean club tournament, or through the CONCACAF League. Since 2018, the CONCACAF Caribbean Club Championship was open to teams from professional leagues, where they could qualify as champions or runners-up of their respective association's league in the previous season.

Another three teams from the Caribbean qualified for the CONCACAF League, which were the runners-up and third-placed team of the CONCACAF Caribbean Club Championship, and the winners of a playoff between the fourth-placed team of the CONCACAF Caribbean Club Championship and the champions of the CONCACAF Caribbean Club Shield, the second-tier subcontinental Caribbean club tournament which was open to teams from non-professional leagues, where they could qualify as champions of their respective association's league in the previous season. Therefore, between one and four teams from the Caribbean could qualify for the CONCACAF Champions League.

CONCACAF League

Besides the ten direct entrants of the CONCACAF Champions League, another 22 teams (1 from North America, 18 from Central America, and 3 from the Caribbean) qualified for the CONCACAF League, a tournament held from July to November prior to the CONCACAF Champions League. The top six teams of the CONCACAF League, i.e., champions, runners-up, both losing semi-finalists, and best two losing quarter-finalists, qualified for the CONCACAF Champions League.

Teams
The following 16 teams (from eight associations) qualified for the tournament.
North American Zone: 9 teams (from three associations)
Central American Zone: 6 teams (from four associations), all of them qualified through the 2019 CONCACAF League
Caribbean Zone: 1 team (from one association)

In the following table, the number of appearances, last appearance, and previous best result count only those in the CONCACAF Champions League era starting from 2008–09 (not counting those in the era of the Champions' Cup from 1962 to 2008).

Notes

Draw

The draw for the 2020 CONCACAF Champions League was held on 9 December 2019, 21:00 EST (local time 20:00 CST), at the University of the Cloister of Sor Juana in Mexico City.

The draw determined each tie in the round of 16 (numbered 1 through 8) between a team from Pot 1 and a team from Pot 2, each containing eight teams. The "Bracket Position Pots" (Pot A and Pot B) contained the bracket positions numbered 1 through 8 corresponding to each tie. The teams from Pot 1 were assigned a bracket position from Pot A and the teams from Pot 2 were assigned a bracket position from Pot B. Teams from the same association could not be drawn against each other in the round of 16 except for "wildcard" teams which replaced a team from another association.

The seeding of teams was based on the CONCACAF Club Index. The CONCACAF Club Index, instead of ranking each team, was based on the on-field performance of the teams that had occupied the respective qualifying slots in the previous five editions of the CONCACAF Champions League. To determine the total points awarded to a slot in any single edition of the CONCACAF Champions League, CONCACAF used the following formula:

The slots were assigned by the following rules:
For teams from North America, nine teams qualified based on criteria set by their association (e.g., tournament champions, runners-up, cup champions), resulting in an assigned slot (e.g., MEX1, MEX2) for each team. If a team from Canada qualified through the CONCACAF League, they were ranked within their association, resulting in an assigned slot (i.e., CAN2) for them.
For teams from Central America, they qualified through the CONCACAF League, and were ranked per association by their CONCACAF League ranking, resulting in an assigned slot (e.g., CRC1, CRC2) for each team.
For teams from the Caribbean, the CONCACAF Caribbean Club Championship champions were assigned the Caribbean champion slot (i.e., CCC1). If teams from the Caribbean qualified through the CONCACAF League, they were ranked per association by their CONCACAF League ranking, resulting in an assigned slot (e.g., JAM1, SUR1) for each team.

The 16 teams were distributed in the pots as follows:

Format
In the CONCACAF Champions League, the 16 teams played a single-elimination tournament. Each tie was initially played on a home-and-away two-legged basis.
In the round of 16, the away goals rule was applied if the aggregate score was tied after the second leg. If still tied, a penalty shoot-out was used to determine the winner (Regulations Article 12.7).
In the three two-leg quarter-final series, the away goals rule was applied if the aggregate score was tied after the second leg, as the second legs were considered as "home" matches of the original host teams. If still tied, a penalty shoot-out was used to determine the winner.
In the one single-leg quarter-final series, and the two single-leg semi-finals, if the score was tied after the end of match, a penalty shoot-out was used to determine the winner.
In the single-leg final, extra time was played if the score was tied after the end of match. If the score was still tied after extra time, a penalty shoot-out was used to determine the winner.

Schedule
The schedule of the competition was as follows.

Times are Eastern Time, as listed by CONCACAF (local times are in parentheses):
Times on 10 and 11 March 2020 (originally scheduled quarter-finals first leg matches) are Eastern Daylight Time, i.e., UTC−4.
Times otherwise are Eastern Standard Time, i.e., UTC−5.

Bracket
{{#invoke:RoundN|main|columns=4|3rdplace=no
|style       = font-size:90%
|score-boxes = 3
|team-width = 180
|nowrap     = yes
|RD1        = Round of 16
|RD2        = Quarter-finals
|RD3        = Semi-finals
|RD4        = Final

|| San Carlos|3|0|3| New York City FC|5|1|6
|| Alianza|2|2|4| UANL|1|4|5
|| Saprissa|2|0|'2| Montreal Impact (a)|2|0|2|| Olimpia |2|2|4 (4)||2|2|4 (2)
|| León|2|0|2| Los Angeles FC|0|3|3
|| Portmore United|1|0|1| Cruz Azul|2|4|6
|| Comunicaciones|1|1|2 (3)| América |1|1|2 (5)
|| Motagua|1|0|1| Atlanta United FC|1|3|4

|| New York City FC|0|0|0| '''UANL|1|4|5|| Montreal Impact|1|1|2| Olimpia (a)|2|0|2|| Los Angeles FC|||2| Cruz Azul|||1|| América|3|0|3| Atlanta United FC|0|1|1|| UANL|||3| Olimpia|||0|| Los Angeles FC|||3| América|||1|| UANL|||2| Los Angeles FC|||1'}}

Round of 16
In the round of 16, the matchups were decided by draw: R16-1 through R16-8. The teams from Pot 1 in the draw hosted the second leg.

Summary
The first legs were played from 18–20 February, and the second legs were played from 25–27 February 2020.

|}

MatchesAtlanta United FC won 4–1 on aggregate.Tied 2–2 on aggregate. América won 5–3 on penalties.Cruz Azul won 6–1 on aggregate.Los Angeles FC won 3–2 on aggregate.UANL won 5–4 on aggregate.New York City FC won 6–3 on aggregate.Tied 4–4 on aggregate. Olimpia won 4–2 on penalties.Tied 2–2 on aggregate. Montreal Impact won on away goals.Quarter-finals
In the quarter-finals, the matchups were determined as follows:
QF1: Winner R16-1 vs. Winner R16-2
QF2: Winner R16-3 vs. Winner R16-4
QF3: Winner R16-5 vs. Winner R16-6
QF4: Winner R16-7 vs. Winner R16-8
The winners of round of 16 matchups 1, 3, 5 and 7 were originally planned to host the second leg.

Summary
The first legs were played from 10–11 March, with the final match originally scheduled to be played on 12 March, and the second legs were originally scheduled to be played from 17–18 March 2020. Following resumption of the tournament, the second legs were played at Exploria Stadium in Orlando from 15–16 December 2020. The two-leg match between Los Angeles FC and Cruz Azul was changed to a single-leg match as a result.

||colspan="2" 

|}

MatchesAmérica won 3–1 on aggregate.UANL won 5–0 on aggregate.Tied 2–2 on aggregate. Olimpia won on away goals.''

Semi-finals
In the semi-finals, the matchups were determined as follows:
SF1: Winners QF1 vs. Winners QF2
SF2: Winners QF3 vs. Winners QF4

Summary
The first legs were originally scheduled to be played from 7–9 April, and the second legs were originally scheduled to be played from 14–16 April 2020. Following resumption of the tournament, the semi-finals were played at Exploria Stadium in Orlando on 19 December 2020 as single-leg matches.

|}

Matches

Final

The first leg was originally scheduled to be played between 28 and 30 April, and the second leg was originally scheduled to be played between 5 and 7 May 2020. Following resumption of the tournament, the final was played at Exploria Stadium in Orlando on 22 December 2020 as a single-leg match.

Top goalscorers

Awards

See also
2019 CONCACAF League

Notes

References

External links

 
2020
1
February 2020 sports events in North America
March 2020 sports events in North America
December 2020 sports events in the United States
Association football events postponed due to the COVID-19 pandemic